Sudarum Sooravaliyum is a 1971 Tamil-language drama film directed by Puttanna Kanagal and written by V. C. Guhanathan. Jointly produced by AVM Productions and Chitramala Combines, The film stars Gemini Ganesan, R. Muthuraman, Jaya Guhanathan and Vennira Aadai Nirmala. It was released on 12 August 1971.

Plot

Cast 
 Gemini Ganesan
 R. Muthuraman
 Jaya Guhanathan
 Vennira Aadai Nirmala
 M. R. R. Vasu
 Chandra Mohan
 Thengai Srinivasan

Production 
Sudarum Sooravaliyum was directed by Puttanna Kanagal. It was jointly produced by AVM Productions and Chitramala Combines, while the story, screenplay and dialogues were written by V. C. Guhanathan. S. P. Muthuraman worked as associate director. Chandra Mohan's voice was dubbed by Kamal Haasan.

Soundtrack 
The lyrics composed by Kannadasan and the music was composed by M. S. Viswanathan.

References

External links 
 

1970s Tamil-language films
1971 drama films
AVM Productions films
Films directed by Puttanna Kanagal
Films scored by M. S. Viswanathan
Indian drama films